Families USA is a nonprofit, nonpartisan consumer health advocacy and policy organization.

Co-founded founded in 1981 by Ronald Pollack, the first executive director, and Philippe Villers, the organization's current president, Families USA's advocacy in Washington, D.C., has influenced health care legislation and policy, including the Inflation Reduction Act of 2022, federal and state legislation in response to the COVID-19 pandemic, the Affordable Care Act, defending against efforts to repeal the Affordable Care Act, and the Children’s Health Insurance Program (CHIP).

President Barack Obama credited Families USA with playing an instrumental role in promoting the enactment of the ACA and for the organization’s work in helping to implement and protect the historic health legislation. On a printed copy of the ACA displayed in Families USA’s office, Obama wrote, “To Ron and Families USA – You made this happen!”

Since 2017, Families USA's current executive director Frederick Isasi has testified before Congress on issues including health care costs, payment and delivery reform, and healthcare coverage. Families USA has been involved in state-by-state campaigns to address the Medicaid coverage gap among low-income Americans, supporting legislative strategies and producing analysis documenting the benefits of extending health coverage.

Families USA has organized several structured dialogues on key health care issues among diverse stakeholder organization leaders, including those representing insurers, hospitals, physicians, pharmaceutical companies, business, labor, and consumers. One such dialogue led to the creation of the Campaign for Children’s Health Care, which successfully pushed to extend CHIP. Another set of dialogues sought and achieved common ground on extending health coverage to the uninsured. A more recent dialogue developed proposals for promoting increased quality care at lower costs.

On November 23, 2016, Vanity Fair reported that shortly after Donald Trump won the 2016 presidential election, Families USA held a conference call with more than 1,000 people from all 50 states to discuss efforts to keep the Affordable Care Act alive. In 2017, Frederick Isasi was appointed Executive Director of Families USA.

Background 
Families USA’s co-founder, Ronald Pollack, has created a number of other organizations. For 10 years he served as the founding executive director of the Food Research and Action Center (FRAC), an organization devoted to ending hunger in America. At FRAC, he successfully argued two cases on the same day in the U.S. Supreme Court that protected food aid for low-income people, and he argued the federal court case that initiated the Supplemental Feeding Program for Women, Infants, and Children (WIC). Pollack is the founding and current board chair of Enroll America, an organization dedicated to enrolling people in health coverage who were previously uninsured.

Pollack was Dean of the Antioch University School of Law. He was appointed by President Bill Clinton to be the sole consumer representative on the Presidential Advisory Commission on Consumer Protection and Quality in the Health Care Industry, which developed the Patients’ Bill of Rights.

The Hill named Pollack one of the nine top nonprofit lobbyists. Modern Healthcare named him one of the 100 Most Powerful People in Health Care. National Journal named Pollack one of the top 25 players in Congress, the Administration, and the lobbying community on Medicare prescription drug benefits.

Achievements/Accreditation 
 Obama credited Families USA with playing an instrumental role in promoting the enactment of the ACA and for the organization’s work helping to implement and protect the historic health legislation. On a printed copy of the ACA displayed in Families USA’s office, Obama wrote “To Ron and Families USA – You made this happen!”

See also
 List of healthcare reform advocacy groups in the United States
 Physicians for a National Health Program

References

External links
 Official website
 Campaign for Children's Health Care

Healthcare reform advocacy groups in the United States
Medical and health organizations based in Washington, D.C.
1989 establishments in the United States
1989 establishments in Washington, D.C.
Organizations established in 1981